Pir Mohammad (also Romanized as Pīr Moḩammad) is a village in Kivanat Rural District, Kolyai District, Sonqor County, Kermanshah Province, Iran. At the 2006 census, its population was 70, in 19 families.

References 

Populated places in Sonqor County